Daniel Massey (24 February 1798 – 15 November 1856) was an American-born blacksmith and businessman in what is now Newcastle, Ontario, who began production of agricultural implements in 1847.

Life and career
Massey was born in Windsor, Vermont, to Daniel Massey Sr. and Rebecca Kelley. The Massey family originated in Cheshire, England, and arrived in America around 1630, first in Essex, Massachusetts, and later in New Hampshire and Watertown, New York.

His parents, Daniel and Rebecca Massey, moved their family to Upper Canada at some point between 1802 and 1807. He subsequently lived and studied in Watertown, New York, but he later returned to Upper Canada to run his father's business. The business grew and its eventual successor, Massey Ferguson, became a multinational farm implement manufacturer. The company's history goes back to 1847, when Massey opened a workshop to build simple farm implements in Newcastle. A decade later, Alanson Harris established a foundry to make and repair farm machinery.

Massey and Harris both became eminent in making harvesting machinery, and eventually the firms they had founded were merged in 1891 to form Massey-Harris. The new company was responsible for producing the world's first commercially successful self-propelled combine harvester in 1938. Massey-Harris merged with the Ferguson Company in 1953 to form what became Massey Ferguson. They brought together their twin skills in harvesting machinery and tractor design to produce one of the world's most prominent companies in farm equipment.

Family
Massey married Lucina Bradley in 1820, and they had three sons and seven daughters. His son Hart Massey also joined the family company. Massey died in 1856 and is buried at Bowmanville Cemetery in Clarington, Ontario.

The actor Raymond Massey was Daniel Massey's great-grandson (Hart Massey's grandson), and the actors Daniel Massey and Anna Massey were Raymond Massey's children.

External links
Biography at the Dictionary of Canadian Biography Online

1798 births
1856 deaths
Daniel Massey
Canadian blacksmiths
Canadian chief executives
Canadian manufacturing businesspeople
Canadian people of American descent
People from Northumberland County, Ontario
People from Windsor, Vermont